Mahesh Perera (born 2 January 1974) is a Sri Lankan hurdler. He competed in the men's 110 metres hurdles at the 1996 Summer Olympics.

References

External links
 

1974 births
Living people
Athletes (track and field) at the 1996 Summer Olympics
Sri Lankan male hurdlers
Olympic athletes of Sri Lanka
Place of birth missing (living people)
Athletes (track and field) at the 1994 Asian Games
Athletes (track and field) at the 1998 Asian Games
Asian Games competitors for Sri Lanka
20th-century Sri Lankan people
21st-century Sri Lankan people